Re-Traced is an EP by the technical metal band Cynic. It is composed of four re-interpretations of songs from their album Traced in Air, as well as one new song. It was released through Season of Mist on May 17.

History
During the 2010 tour in support of Between the Buried and Me along with Scale the Summit and the Devin Townsend Project, the band performed live "an experiment". Shortly after unveiling this new work, the band announced a new EP coming soon on their MySpace blog. Tymon Kruidenier revealed in an interview the plans for the coming EP:

It was later revealed via a Youtube teaser that the EP was entitled Re-Traced.

More details were announced about the upcoming EP release on their MySpace blog. Paul Masvidal also commented on the new artwork and layout:

The EP was produced by the band with the help of Warren Riker on mixing and Maor Appelbaum on mastering.

On September 3, 2021, Cynic released a new version of "Integral" featuring the late Sean Malone on bass as a tribute, with half of the proceeds going to suicide prevention organizations To Write Love on Her Arms and The Trevor Project.

Track listing

Personnel
 Paul Masvidal – vocals, guitar, guitar synth
 Sean Reinert – drums, percussion
 Robin Zielhorst – bass
 Tymon Kruidenier – lead guitar
 Warren Riker -  mixing
 Maor Appelbaum -  mastering

References

Cynic (band) EPs
2010 EPs
Season of Mist EPs